Thăng Bình is a rural district (huyện) of Quảng Nam province in the South Central Coast region of Vietnam. As of 2003 the district had a population of 186,964. The district capital lies at Hà Lam.

References

Districts of Quảng Nam province